The Women's foil event of the 2018 World Fencing Championships was held on 23 July 2018. The qualification was held on 20 July 2018.

Draw

Finals

Top half

Section 1

Section 2

Bottom half

Section 3

Section 4

References

External links
Bracket

2018 World Fencing Championships
World